Stefan Mappus (born 4 April 1966) is a German politician from the Christian Democratic Union (CDU). He was the 8th Minister President of the state of Baden-Württemberg 2010–2011 and chairman of the CDU Baden-Württemberg 2009–2011.

After losing the 2011 Baden-Württemberg state election Mappus announced his resignation of the party chair. Currently, he is a Member of the Board of Advisors of the Global Panel Foundation.

EnBW affair
The public prosecutor's office in Stuttgart opened an investigation on 11 July 2012 against prime minister Stefan Mappus, several other ministers and Dirk Notheis, former head of Morgan Stanley Germany, in connection with the state's controversial purchase of a stake in utility Energie Baden-Wuerttemberg. Morgan Stanley's German operations, headed by Notheis, in 2010 advised Baden-Württemberg on the purchase of a roughly 45% stake in EnBW from French state-controlled utility Électricité de France for nearly 4.7 billion euros (about $5.77 billion) valuing the asset at a multiple of 6x operating profits. Also advising was Stuttgart law firm Gleiss Lutz. The transaction was signed four weeks after a decision by the German federal parliament to extend the maturities of existing nuclear power plants for another ten years on top of their existing license. Four months after the transaction, on 15 March 2011, the accident in a nuclear power plant in Fukushima/Japan happened, resulting in the decision by the Federal government to phase out nuclear generation, which adversely affected EnBW and its value. In addition to several fairness opinions as to the valuation of EnBW provided to the stakeholders at the time of the transaction, in total seven reviews over the EnBW share valuation were conducted over the process of the investigation. The dominating majority of reviews came to the conclusion that the price paid for the EnBW shares was fair. A review conducted by Professor Wolfgang Ballwieser deviated from the valuation consensus, however fell into great controversy after a material miscalculation of approximately €1b was discovered in Ballwieser's valuation.

The investigation was withdrawn by the State Attorney in October 2014 without any obligations at all to Mappus and the other individuals. Stefan Mappus and all others were cleared and informed in letters addressed to their respective lawyers dated 29 October 2014, in which they were also granted the right to make claims for damages.

Personal life 
Mappus is a Protestant and comes from a shoemaker-family in Mühlacker-Enzberg. Since 2001 he is married to in Kleve born Susanne Verweyen-Mappus, they have two sons and live in Pforzheim.

References

1966 births
Living people
Members of the Landtag of Baden-Württemberg
Christian Democratic Union of Germany politicians
German Protestants
Ministers-President of Baden-Württemberg